The University of Okoboji is a university in the state of Iowa in the United States of America. The university was the creation of three brothers in the early 1970s, who printed T-shirts with an "official" school crest. The word "Okoboji" refers to several lakes, and to the town of Okoboji, in the Iowa Great Lakes region that are popular recreational destinations.

The university is home of the "undefeated" Fighting Phantoms.

It is common among those alumni to display university decor, such as car decals and T-shirts to show their proudness from attending the University.. The name is now used in connection with several annual fund-raising events for charity, including bike rides, a marathon, and a winter games competition. A local radio station, KUOO,  has joined in refers to itself as the "campus radio".

References cited

Iowa culture
Okoboji
1970s establishments in Iowa
Okoboji and the Iowa Great Lakes by Jonathon M Reed